Mendozachorista is an extinct genus of insect which existed in Argentina during the Late Triassic period. It was named by Carsten Brauckmann, Oscar F. Gallego, Norbert Hauschke, Rafael G. Martins-Neto, Elke Groening, Jan-M. Ilger and María B. Lara in 2010, and the type and only species is Mendozachorista volkheimeri. It is known only from an impression of a Mecopterida-like wing found in the Llantenes Formation in Mendoza Province.

References 

Triassic insects
Prehistoric insect genera
Norian life
Late Triassic animals of South America
Triassic Argentina
Fossils of Argentina
Fossil taxa described in 2010